Aloe tororoana  is a species of Aloe native to southeast Uganda. The name references Tororo Rock which was then thought to be where the species was endemic to.

References

tororoana
Plants described in 1953
Flora of Uganda